Dinizia jueirana-facao is a tree in the family Fabaceae which grows in a restricted area of rainforest in Espírito Santo state in Brazil. It was first described by G. P. Lewis & G. S. Siqueira in 2004. Its specific name derives from its local name, "jueirana-facão". There are currently fewer than 25 specimens in existence, making the species critically endangered.

Physical Features 
The tree can grow up to 130 feet and weigh over 60 tons.

References 

Caesalpinioideae
Trees of Brazil
Critically endangered flora of South America